Andinobates tolimensis, the Tolimense poison frog,  is a species of amphibian in the family Dendrobatidae, endemic to Colombia in the outskirts of Falan and north of the department of Tolima. Previously it was included in the genus Ranitomeya, but was reclassified in Andinobates, along with 11 other species. It is threatened by habitat loss. It is toxic to humans and when captured will excrete a milky substance.

Description 
Its skin is golden or coppery with yellow spots on the upper part of the front legs and sometimes from the junction of these to the lower lip; a black or brown spot goes over the yellow one.

Behavior 
Calls occur in a series of short, soft buzzes (each lasting 0.84-0.99 seconds), like cricket sounds and similar to calls made by A. dorisswansonae, but softer. The call is pulsed and has a dominant frequency of 4.73-5.22 kHz as recorded in captivity.

Males will carry single tadpoles on their back, demonstrating parental care.

Taxonomy 
It was discovered in 2006 by biologist Oscar Gallego and identified as a different species by herpetologist Juan Manuel Rengifo. The description was made by a team led by experts from the University of Tolima and was published in 2007.

The species name tolimensis means 'from Tolima', which references the University where it was found.

References 

tolimensis